Patterson Lakes is a suburb in Melbourne, Victoria, Australia,  south-east of Melbourne's Central Business District, located within the City of Kingston local government area. Patterson Lakes recorded a population of 7,793 at the 2021 census.

Patterson Lakes is a canal-rich suburb. The suburb consists predominantly of new housing developments, and is home to the most popular boat launching facilities in Victoria. The Patterson River is a popular boating portal for Port Phillip Bay. It includes four public launching ramps; joins the Tidal Canal system to Port Phillip; and includes the Patterson Lakes Marina and its facilities in Middle Harbour and Inner Harbour.

History

Early history
After the melting of the last great ice age, sea levels were 1–2 metres higher than today. When sea levels subsided to their current levels, fresh water from the Dandenong Ranges flowed into low-lying regions. Carrum Carrum Swamp, an extensive coastal wetland, was created, encompassing an area some 5,000 hectares from present-day Mordialloc to Frankston and inland towards Dandenong.

Prior to European discovery, the Patterson Lakes area was populated by Indigenous Australians known as the Kulin people. Inhabitants in the area were from the Bunurong language group, of the Mayone-Bulluk clan. 
Both the Mayone-Bulluk and Ngaruk-Willam clans would meet in the area of Dandenong often to hold ceremonies and trade. These gatherings were often attended by guests from other Bunurong clans or from neighbouring tribes, such as the Wathaurung and the Wurundjeri clans from the Woiwurong. As with most indigenous people of the world, Mayone-Bulluk cultural, ceremonial and spiritual life was dictated by the seasonal availability of natural resources. Through thousands of years of observation Bunurong People were able to predict the availability of their seasonal resources by certain changes in plant growth and animal behaviour.

Europeans first set foot in nearby Frankston as early as 1803, thirty-two years before the founding of Melbourne (the first major European settlement in the then Port Phillip District). A commemorative plaque near the mouth of Kananook Creek marks the location of where Charles Grimes and his party went ashore searching for fresh water, and met with approximately 30 local inhabitants.

The foundation of Patterson Lakes
Early development was hampered by poor soils, distance from the Melbourne city centre, and the existence of a major swamp occupying much of the area between Mordialloc and Seaford.

In 1866 the Carrum Carrum Swamp was surveyed and the land between Mordialloc Creek and Keast Park in Seaford was divided into 18 allotments and sold by auction for around three pounds per acre. In 1871 the government opened it for selection. The swamp was an impediment to the settlers and there was much discussion on how to reclaim the land, the first contracts for drainage works commenced in 1873. Attempts to reclaim the lower swamplands were ineffective. In 1876 it was decided to cut a 10-metre wide channel to Port Phillip Bay. It was to be known as 'Patterson Cut' and had been named after a State Parliamentarian and commissioner for public works - Sir James Brown Patterson.
In 1876 the area that is now occupied by Patterson Lakes was owned by Kate and Henry Woodward,(HRW Woodward and Sons) who used the area for holding pastures for livestock. In the early 1970s some 200 acres of this area was subdivided by the Woodward family into Melbourne's first subdivision around artificial lakes.
Other occupants of the area were the Priestly family who had landholdings either side of the Patterson River and ran a marina just east of what is now Pier One Drive.
The Fitzgerald family ran a horse riding centre on the north-east corner of Thompsons Road and Old Wells Road on land that is now owned by Melbourne Water.
The Walker family also owned some of the southernmost land bordering Eel Race Creek at one stage.

The suburb of Patterson Lakes was to be located in Carrum on what was originally part of the Carrum Carrum Swamp. The Carrum Carrum Swamp was drained in 1879 when the Patterson Cut, and other drainage measures were undertaken to prevent flooding of the Eumemmering Creek, which overflowed into the Carrum Carrum Swamp. The mouth of the Patterson Cut was mostly only open during the winter months, so heavy spring and summer rains often caused flooding to properties on the edge of the swamp area. Flood damage as far north as Edithvale often occurred. The only remnants of the Carrum Carrum Swamp now form the Edithvale-Seaford Wetlands (a Ramsar Wetland of International Importance.)

The Carrum Cowboys
The Carrum Cowboys were a group of teenagers, who rode their horses around Carrum and the surrounding areas in the late 1950s and 1960s. The name was a tag given to the group by the local police. The Cowboys rode on footpaths and were often riding too fast at the beach, which would lead to a number of complaints from local residents. On several occasions members of the Cowboys were pursued by police, which led to court action and fines being imposed. The over 50s AFL team for Patterson Lakes and Carrum is called the Carrum Cowboys.

The development of Patterson Lakes
The decision to go ahead with what was originally going to be called Gladesville took place in 1973.
The development of residential areas adjacent to canals and waterways had been carried out successfully in many places. No-one had attempted to do this in Victoria unlike in other states. When Len Woodward looked closely at the land adjoining the Patterson River, he saw the possibility of a development. If it proved to be feasible and practicable, it would give home owners access to Port Phillip from their "back door".
A large part of the area to the east of Carrum had flooded in the 1930s and 1950s, but to the engineers investigating the land, the important issues were why this occurred and how it could be prevented from occurring again. A common misconception was that the area was all swamp and mud. Extensive drilling found that only a surface layer of peat-like material was unsuitable. Underneath this layer was fine dense sand. The engineers realised that once the unsuitable material was removed (and used to strengthen levee banks and create landscaped areas and reserves) they would then be able to excavate to form lakes and canals, and use the excavated sand in forming residential sites. By using this fine, dense, carefully compacted sand, all the proposed residential sites would be brought to a level above that required by the authorities.
The first soil was turned in 1974 in the north-east corner of Patterson Lakes around Iluka Island (Lake Legana.) Originally the plans were to build high rise towers of up to 15 stories in height.
Patterson Lakes was rezoned from rural to residential.
Central sites were planned for a shopping centre and for a marina which would have a second access to the river via flood gates. Sites for housing and apartments overlooking the marina and the river were identified. Sites for a primary school and for community facilities were also incorporated into the overall plan. Also the project was "different", in that more than a hundred non-lake, residential sites were created to further the concept of a new community having a mix of socio-economic groups.

Other history

1960s
The Priestley family after gaining relevant approval were instrumental in establishing a dry dock marina. The first man made marina in the Southern Hemisphere was formed and the largest of its kind in Victoria. Having originally been named Whaler's Cove Marina the marina was later renamed Patterson Lakes Marina.
In February 1966 the local coastguard branch was setup.  The inaugural meeting of Flotilla 7 was held at a private residence in Chelsea on Tues 15 Feb 1966 at 8pm.  From day one in 1966 until 2011, Bill Hills was a member of VF07, a remarkable achievement.
The executive was made up of:
Commander: Reg Skinner
 Deputy Commander, Bill Hills
 Staff Officer, Bob White
 Training Officer, Alf Priestley
In April 1966 the Patterson Lakes Canoe Club was founded, and in 2001 a new clubhouse was built at the Patterson River Launching Way.

1980s
The Patterson Lakes Radio Model Yacht Club was founded in 1981.
The Patterson Lakes Community Centre was founded in 1985.
Patterson Lakes Post Office opened on 1 April 1986.
The National Watersports Centre was founded in 1988.

1990s
Carrum Rowing Club was founded in 1991.
The National Watersports Centre Ski Club was founded in 1992.
In 1999 the Dingley Pony Club moved to Patterson Lakes.

2000s
In January 2004 the Patterson Lakes Outrigger Club was founded at the Patterson River Launching Way.
The Patterson Lakes Library was founded in late 2009.
The Gladesville Shopping Centre was founded in late 2011.
The Carrum and Patterson Lakes Forum was formed in 2010 and the now disbanded, Residents Association of Patterson Lakes was formed in 2012 after Melbourne Water made changes to the precept rates.

Facilities

Patterson Lakes is serviced by the following shopping complexes: Lakeview Shopping Centre, Harbour Plaza Shopping Town & Medical Centre, Gladesville Shopping Centre and The Glade.

Sports and hobby facilities
Patterson Lakes Basketball Club
Patterson Lakes Outrigger Club
Patterson Lakes Swim School
Dingley Pony Club
Dragons Abreast Patterson Lakes Pink Lotus 
Carrum Patterson Lakes Junior Football Club
Long Beach Tennis Club
Patterson Lakes Tennis Club
Carrum Cricket Club
Patterson Lakes Canoe Club
Carrum Rowing Club
Carrum Sailing Club
Victorian Drag Boat Club Paterson Lakes Club
National Water Sports Centre Ski Club
Patterson Lakes Radio Model Yacht Club
Patterson River Motor Boat Club

Other facilities
Patterson Lakes Marina
Patterson River Launching Way
Patterson Lakes Library
Patterson Lakes Community Centre
National Watersports Centre - developed as an international standard rowing facility in preparation for Melbourne's bid for the 1996 Olympic Games.
Numerous retirement villages
Numerous cafes and restaurants

Education

Patterson Lakes is serviced by a government primary school, Patterson Lakes Primary School, which operates within Patterson Lakes and a government secondary school, Patterson River Secondary College, which operates from Seaford on the southern boundary of Patterson Lakes.
The closest private secondary school to Patterson Lakes is the Cornish College in Bangholme and Haileybury in Keysborough.

Transport

Patterson Lakes is serviced by the Carrum railway station, located in Carrum, approximately two kilometres to the west of Patterson Lakes, on the Frankston Line operated by Metro Trains Melbourne.

Access to the area by road is from the Nepean Highway, EastLink, Mornington Peninsula Freeway and Peninsula Link. Patterson Lakes has freeways at its door-step with a travel time to the CBD of 30–35 minutes.

Patterson Lakes is accessible by a number of PTV bus routes servicing the area, which includes the 857 and 708.

Fame

The filming at Kath Day-Knight and Kel Knight's "townhouse" (in the fictional suburb of Fountain Lakes), in the Australian comedy television series Kath & Kim, is shot in Patterson Lakes in Lagoon Place.
Kath & Kimderella was also filmed at the same location as the original Day-Knight house of the TV series.

Former Prime Minister of Australia John Howard has visited Patterson Lakes Primary School to speak on their radio station, as have Bert Newton, the hosts of former radio show Get This, Tony Martin and Ed Kavalee.
Patterson Lakes was previously the home to NBA player Andrew Bogut and his family, who used to own two homes in Coral Island Court on the Tidal Canal.

Politics

Patterson Lakes is in the federal Division of Isaacs and has been represented by Labor MP Mark Dreyfus in federal parliament since 2007.

Patterson Lakes is in the District of Carrum in Victoria's Legislative Assembly, represented since 2014 by Labor MP Sonya Kilkenny.

Members for Carrum:

Environment

Regions
Lake Carramar, Lake Illawong and Lake Legana, collectively known as the Quiet Lakes, are three interconnected (via pumps and underground drains) but tidally isolated ponds at the suburb's northern neighbourhoods. The canal system that runs through most of Patterson Lakes is known as the Tidal Canal. Landmarks inside the Tidal Canal region include Clipper Island, Mariners Island, Staten Island, Rhode Island, Barellen Harbours and Schooner Bay.

Other landmarks of Patterson Lakes include Wannarkladdin Wetlands, Patterson River and Eel Race Drain (later becomes the Kananook Creek.) The Patterson Lakes Marina has facilities at the Town Centre (Inner Harbour), Runaway Bay (Middle Harbour) and Whaler's Cove (Western Harbour). The
Patterson River is managed by Parks Victoria, while the Tidal Canal system and the Quiet Lakes are managed by Melbourne Water.

Climate
Patterson Lakes has a temperate climate similar to that of Melbourne, however it is usually 2°C cooler than the Melbourne CBD. In many cases, Patterson Lakes is one of the first suburbs of the Greater Melbourne area to feel the effect of the cool weather change that occurs during the summer season.

Walking & cycling trails
 Dandenong Creek Trail
 Bay Trail
 Peninsula Link Trail

Parks
 Roy Dore Reserve
 Adelong Court Reserve
 Arrunga Court Reserve
 Gladesville Boulevard Reserve
 Kalang Court Reserve
 Legana Court Reserve
 William Salthouse Park (named after the William Salthouse Ship that sank in Port Phillip Bay)
 John Lindsay Reserve (named after a paralympian called John Lindsay in 1996)
 Patterson River (managed by Parks Victoria)

Flora
Indigenous floral species include the silver wattle, samphire, lightwood, blackwood, black she-oak, river red gum, spike wattle, hedge wattle, scrub she-oak, jagged fireweed, silver top wallaby grass, Australian salt grass and the blue tussock grass. Non-indigenous floral species include the sheep's burr, angled onion, lesser joyweed, broom spurge, common swamp wallaby grass, pointed centrolepis, common spikerush and small spikerush.

Fauna
Reptile species found in Patterson Lakes include the Bougainville's skink, grass skink, tree dragon, copperhead snake and tiger snake.
Aquatic species include the striped marsh frog, water rat, platypus, bream, flathead, tupong, Australian salmon, leatherjacket, yelloweye mullet, silver trevally, black crab, spider crab, eel, bass yabbies, mussels and pippies.
Bird species include the nankeen (rufous) night heron, white-faced heron, chestnut teal, straw-necked ibis, pacific black duck, pacific gull, silver gull, magpie-lark, Australian pelican, little pied cormorant, royal spoonbill, masked lapwing, whiskered (marsh) tern and the caspian tern.

Fishing
The Patterson River abounds with fish. Considered that there have been several reports of illegal fishing over the last few years, the fish always seem to fight back in this popular waterway. A number of charter companies operate from Patterson River. Bream and a few other varieties of fish can be sourced from the Tidal Canal and Patterson River systems.

See also
 City of Springvale – Patterson Lakes was previously within this former local government area.
 City of Kingston – Patterson Lakes is located within this local government area.
 Patterson Lakes Marina
 Patterson River
 Dandenong Creek Trail
 Kath & Kim
 Electoral district of Carrum
 Bay Trail

References

Suburbs of Melbourne
Suburbs of the City of Kingston (Victoria)